Earl James Okine (born January 4, 1990) is an American football defensive end who is a free agent. He attended the University of Florida and signed with the Houston Texans as an undrafted free agent in 2013. Okine has also been a member of the CFL's Calgary Stampeders, Saskatchewan Roughriders, and Toronto Argonauts, the Arena Football League's Orlando Predators, the Fall Experimental Football League's Brooklyn Bolts, the NFL's Indianapolis Colts, Kansas City Chiefs and Detroit Lions, and the AAF's Orlando Apollos.

High school & college
Okine played football and basketball for Gainesville High School. In football, he earned a Third-team Class 5A all-state selection as a senior. He dressed for 6 games in 2008 while with the Florida Gators, but did not appear and decided to redshirt that year. From 2009 to 2012 recorded 27 tackles, 1 sack, and 1 blocked field goal.

Professional career

Houston Texans
Okine signed as an undrafted free agent with the Houston Texans in May 2013. He was cut before the start of the season.

Calgary Stampeders
He then spent 1 month with the Calgary Stampeders of the Canadian Football League (CFL), but did not appear in any games.

Orlando Predators
In 2014, Okine played for the Orlando Predators of the Arena Football League (AFL) and recorded 5.5 sacks in 16 games.

Brooklyn Bolts
He then played for the Brooklyn Bolts of the newly-formed Fall Experimental Football League.

Indianapolis Colts
On March 3, 2015, Okine signed with the Indianapolis Colts. He appeared in 3 games for the Colts, making 1 tackle, and was waived on October 1. He signed to the Colts' practice squad on October 5. On December 21 he was signed to the active roster. On September 3, 2016, he was waived by the Colts as part of final roster cuts.

Kansas City Chiefs
On September 9, 2016, Okine was signed to the Chiefs' practice squad. He spent time on and off the Chiefs' practice squad throughout the season before signing a reserve/future contract with the team on January 19, 2017.

On September 2, 2017, Okine was waived by the Chiefs.

Detroit Lions
On September 4, 2017, Okine was signed to the Detroit Lions' practice squad. He was released on September 22, 2017.

Arizona Cardinals
On September 26, 2017, Okine was signed to the Arizona Cardinals' practice squad.

Orlando Apollos
Okine signed with the Orlando Apollos of the Alliance of American Football for the 2019 season. In 8 games played with his second Orlando based team, Okine made 17 tackles 5 sacks, 11 quarterback hits, and an interception.

Saskatchewan Roughriders
After the AAF ceased operations in April 2019, Okine signed with the practice roster for the Saskatchewan Roughriders of the Canadian Football League on July 14, 2019. He was promoted to the active roster on July 19. Okine recorded 3 tackles and scored a defensive touchdown during 6 games played, but was released on October 14.

Toronto Argonauts
Okine signed a contract extension with the Toronto Argonauts on December 28, 2020. On February 1, 2021, Okine was released by the Argonauts.

References

External links
 Profile at Colts.com
 Profile at ArenaFootball.com
 Profile at CFL.ca

1990 births
Living people
American football defensive ends
Arizona Cardinals players
Brooklyn Bolts players
Calgary Stampeders players
Detroit Lions players
Florida Gators football players
Houston Texans players
Indianapolis Colts players
Kansas City Chiefs players
Orlando Apollos players
Orlando Predators players
Players of American football from Gainesville, Florida
Sportspeople from Gainesville, Florida
Saskatchewan Roughriders players
Toronto Argonauts players